The uninhabited Plover Islands are an archipelago, members of the Arctic Archipelago and the Ungava Bay Archipelago, in the Qikiqtaaluk Region of Nunavut, Canada. They are located in western Ungava Bay, just northeast of the Arnaud River and the community of Kangirsuk on Quebec's Ungava Peninsula.

Geography
The islands have a hard granitic gneiss and a thin layer of soil. Their perimeter measures .

Flora
Their habitat includes lichen, moss, sedges, and low woody shrubs.

Fauna
Combined with the Payne Islands further to the south, the Plovers are a Canadian Important Bird Area (#NU027). Notable bird species include the common eider and colonial waterbirds/seabirds.

The Plover Islands are a part of the Ungava Bay Archipelagoes, a Key Migratory Terrestrial Bird Site (NU Site 51).

References

External links 
 Plover Islands in the Atlas of Canada - Toporama; Natural Resources Canada
 Map including the Plover Islands

Uninhabited islands of Qikiqtaaluk Region
Archipelagoes of the Canadian Arctic Archipelago
Important Bird Areas of Qikiqtaaluk Region
Seabird colonies